Reclaimed is a Canadian radio program, which airs Wednesday evenings on CBC Music and is repeated the following Sunday evening on CBC Radio One. Hosted by Jarrett Martineau, the program airs music by indigenous musicians from Canada and the world.

The program premiered as a short-run summer series in 2017, before returning to the network's permanent regular-season schedule in November.

References

CBC Music programs
CBC Radio One programs
Canadian music radio programs
Indigenous radio programs in Canada
2017 radio programme debuts